Pyramidella terebelloides, common name the augur-like pyram,  is a species of sea snail, a marine gastropod mollusk in the family Pyramidellidae, the pyrams and their allies.

Description
The shell is more slender than Pyramidella dolabrata terebellum. The columella has two plicae instead of three. The whorls  of the teleoconch contain two or three slim chestnut lines. The length varies between 14 mm and 25 mm.

Distribution
This marine species occurs in the following locations:
 Red Sea
 Tanzania
 South Africa
 the Philippines.

References

External links
 To Biodiversity Heritage Library (4 publications)
 To Encyclopedia of Life
 To World Register of Marine Species

Pyramidellidae
Gastropods described in 1855